As a nickname, Mule may refer to:

In music 

 Major Holley (1924–1990), American jazz bassist
 Henry Townsend (musician) (1909–2006), American blues singer, guitarist and pianist

In sports

Baseball 
 George Mule Armstrong (1885–1954), American Negro League baseball player
 Dick Dietz (1941–2005), American Major League Baseball player
 George Mule Haas (1903–1974), American Major League Baseball player
 John "Mule" Miles (1922–2013), American Negro League baseball player
 Ernest Mule Shirley (1901–1955), American Major League Baseball player
 Joe Sprinz (1902–1994), American Major League Baseball player
 George Mule Suttles (1901–1966), American Negro League baseball player
 John Mule Watson (1896–1949), American Major League Baseball pitcher
 Milt Watson (1890–1962), American Major League Baseball player

American football 
 Herschel Stockton (1913–1965), American National Football League player
 Fay Mule Wilson (1901–1937), American National Football League player

Basketball 
 Reggie King (born 1957), American National Basketball Association player

Ice hockey 
 Johan Franzén (born 1979), Swedish National Hockey League player

See also 

Lists of people by nickname